The G.C. Moses Block is a row of several historic buildings located at 1234-1244 South 13th Street in Downtown Omaha, Nebraska. The two-story building was completed in 1887 by Mendelssohn & Lawrie and Simonds & Linesay, in the Late Victorian style of architecture.

It was built to be used as stores and flats (apartments).

References

National Register of Historic Places in Omaha, Nebraska
Commercial buildings on the National Register of Historic Places in Nebraska
Buildings and structures completed in 1887